is an arcade game released by Capcom in 1991. A side-scrolling beat 'em up based loosely on the legend of King Arthur and the Knights of the Round Table, the game features an action role-playing video game-like level advancement system, with fighters automatically being upgraded to new weapons and armor as they advance through the game. In September 13, 2018, Capcom announced Capcom Beat 'Em Up Bundle with Knights of the Round being one of seven titles and being released digitally for Nintendo Switch, PlayStation 4, Xbox One, and Windows on September 18, 2018.

Plot
Arthur, who had been training himself to be a great knight, pulled out the sacred sword Excalibur from the rock. After pulling it out, Arthur realized his destiny was to become the first King of the Britons. Merlin then sends Arthur and his two closest companions, Lancelot and Perceval, to overthrow the evil king Garibaldi and to unite Britain.

Gameplay

The gameplay is very similar to other Capcom beat 'em ups, such as Final Fight and Capcom's previous hack-and-slash fantasy title The King of Dragons. There are seven stages, each with its own boss and a variety of generic enemies that try to stop the players' progress. The fights rely strongly on the blocking ability, which is triggered by pressing the attack button, then pressing the joystick away as the opponent strikes. If successful, the player gains a few seconds of invincibility with which to counter-attack. However, if no one strikes the player's character while holding the block, they will tire and drop their guard, making them vulnerable to attack. Blocking is vital in certain cases, since some bosses will be vulnerable only after their attack has been blocked by the player.

As in most beat 'em ups, a desperation attack is performed by pressing both the attack and jump buttons simultaneously. This kills off most enemies on the screen, but the player loses a little bit of health every time he uses it.

At various points in the game, the players get to ride a horse, where they can attack enemies on horseback. The horses can stomp on enemies by pressing the joystick two times forward. On occasion, bosses and certain enemy characters can ride horses as well.

Characters 
There are three playable characters:

King Arthur, the main hero, is a well-balanced character in speed and power. His weapon is the sword Excalibur. He can perform a special attack, a powerful slashing blow, by pressing attack then holding the joystick toward the enemy's direction. Initially, Arthur wears chain mail and leather armor. Upon gaining levels, Excalibur becomes stronger, and he eventually gets more body armor (later in silver and gold colors). Arthur is also the most devastating character, when mounted on horseback.
Sir Lancelot is a talented swordsman and has been traveling all over the world to find a worthy king he should serve. Lancelot is the fastest character but lacks in strength. Since the game favors maneuverability, he is very good for beginners. His special attack is the jumping kick, done by pressing attack then holding the joystick up. Sir Lancelot's weapon of choice is a sabre. Sir Lancelot starts out wearing a blue tabard with a yellow cross. In eventual level-ups, Lancelot gains plate armor and a broader sabre.
Sir Perceval, a son of a blacksmith, is a strong warrior with a gentle heart. Unlike his sword-wielding friends King Arthur and Sir Lancelot, Sir Perceval prefers to use a battle-axe as his primary weapon. He has never been defeated thanks to his well-built body. Perceval is the strongest character but lacks in agility, making him good for intermediate to advanced players. He is the only character who can dash by tapping the joystick forward twice, cancelled into a "Giant Swing" by pressing the attack button while dashing. At first, Sir Perceval has blond hair and light armor with green long pants. In eventual level-ups, Sir Perceval becomes bald with a beard, and gains heavier armor, though most of his chest is bare.

Ports
The game was ported to the Super NES in 1994, in Capcom Classics Collection: Reloaded for the PSP in 2006, as well as Capcom Classics Collection Vol. 2 for PlayStation 2 and Xbox and in 2018, in Capcom Beat 'Em Up Bundle for the PlayStation 4, Nintendo Switch, Xbox One and Microsoft Windows.

Reception

In Japan, Game Machine listed Knights of the Round on their March 1, 1992 issue as being the most-successful table arcade unit of the month, outperforming titles such as Street Fighter II: The World Warrior. RePlay also reported the game to be the sixth most-popular arcade game at the time. Play Meter also listed Knights of the Round to be the fifty-first most-popular arcade game at the time.

Sinclair User scored the arcade version a 78/100, writing that players who enjoyed Golden Axe would enjoy Knights of the Round. Anthony Baize, writing for Allgame, called it a "solid quarter muncher with some cool mythological characters." Reviewing the SNES version, GamePro praised the quality of the sprites but remarked that "Slow, repetitive gameplay dulls the edge of this otherwise average game," citing the gameplay's overwhelming focus on crude "hack 'n' slash" combat. In 2018, Complex ranked the game 89th in their "The Best Super Nintendo Games of All Time".

See also 
Magic Sword (video game)

Notes

References

External links
 

1991 video games
Arcade video games
CP System games
Capcom beat 'em ups
Capcom Power System Changer games
Super Nintendo Entertainment System games
Side-scrolling beat 'em ups
Video games based on Arthurian legend
Video games developed in Japan
Multiplayer and single-player video games
Hack and slash games